Las González is a Venezuelan telenovela written by Cesar Miguel Rondòn and Mònica Montañez, and produced by Venevisión in 2002. The series lasted for 91 episodes and was distributed internationally by Venevisión International.

On June 22, 2002, Venevisión started broadcasting Las González weekdays at 9:00 pm with the series airing its final episode on 27 November 2002.

Gaby Espino and Jorge Reyes starred as the main protagonists, accompanied by Adrián Delgado, Alba Roversi and Víctor Cámara.

Cast

 Gaby Espino as Aleli González
 Jorge Reyes as Robinson Gamboa
 Adrián Delgado as Antonio Da Silva
 Alba Roversi as Orquidea González
 Víctor Cámara as Romulo Trigo
 Fabiola Colmenares as Lirio
 Carlos Mata as Cristóbal Rojas
 Gigi Zancheta as Violeta González
 Carlos Olivier as Cayetano Mora
 Caridad Canelón as Hortensia
 Aroldo Betancourt as Próspero
 Beatriz Valdés as Magnolia
 Yanis Chimaras as Américo
 Nohely Arteaga as Camelia González
 Pedro Lander as Walter Piña
 Denise Novell as Gladiola González
 Roberto Lamarca as Otto de Jesús
 Lourdes Valera as Bromelia
 Raúl Amundaray as Ubaldo
 Eva Moreno as Doña Gonzala
 José Luis Zuleta as Ariel
 Elaiza Gil as Jasmin
 Maritza Bustamante as Amapola
 Elizabeth Morales as Trinitaria Pérez
 Beba Rojas as Azalea
 Maria Antonieta Duque as Gardenia
 Beatriz Fuentes as Geranio
 Maria Edilia Rangel as Begoña
 Samantha Suárez as Margarita
 Kimberly Dos Ramos as Petunia
 Michelle Nassef as Rosita
 Adrián Durán as Cayetanito
 Jorge Salas as Romulito
 Mhinniutk Cohelo as Gladiolita
 Jesus Aponte as Yefri

References

External links
 

2002 telenovelas
2002 Venezuelan television series debuts
2002 Venezuelan television series endings
Venevisión telenovelas
Venezuelan telenovelas
Spanish-language telenovelas
Television shows set in Caracas